Unseeded Fred Stolle defeated John Newcombe 4–6, 12–10, 6–3, 6–4 in the final to win the men's singles tennis title at the 1966 U.S. National Championships.

Seeds
The seeded players are listed below. Fred Stolle is the champion; others show the round in which they were eliminated.

 Manuel Santana (semifinals)
 Roy Emerson (semifinals)
 Dennis Ralston (fourth round)
 Tony Roche (third round)
 Arthur Ashe (third round)
 Cliff Drysdale (third round)
 Clark Graebner (quarterfinals)
 Cliff Richey (second round)

Draw

Key
 Q = Qualifier
 WC = Wild card
 LL = Lucky loser
 r = Retired

Final eight

Earlier rounds

Section 1

Section 2

Section 3

Section 4

Section 5

Section 6

Section 7

Section 8

References

External links
 1966 U.S. National Championships on ITFtennis.com, the source for this draw
 Association of Tennis Professionals (ATP) – 1966 U.S. Championships Men's Singles draw

U.S. National Championships (tennis) by year – Men's singles
Mens